Sylvester Samuel better known by his stage name Lil Ru Aka Boobie Samuel, is an American rapper signed to Def Jam Recordings. His debut album, 21 & Up was released on August 25, 2009. After Angie Stone helped him secure a deal with Elektra Records, he became unsigned again after the label merged with Atlantic Records.

His 2001 debut single was "Will Destroy". He then released his 2002 follow up, "Shawty What You Doin’". Both songs reached the Billboard R&B/Hip-Hop charts and he was signed to Capitol Records.

In 2007 Capitol released the Don’t I Look Good, which included the single "I’m Spinnin’ It".  After touring and promoting the album, in March 2009 he was signed to the Def Jam label. He released the single "Nasty Song", then in 2011 appeared on Dirty Dave's single Fast Lane featuring Gucci Mane and Slycka Slyck. The music video was shot and directed by Yung Joc.

In 2015 Ru launched his label Presidential Music and released his "Key Is Mind".

Charts 
Billboard

Discography

Studio albums
For Her (2019)
Boobie Trap (2018)
Key is Mind (2015)
Motion of Discovery (2013)
No Gold Teeth, No Tattoos (2011)
21 & Up (2009)
They Talk, I Grind (2009)
Microwave Music (2008)
Hustle Hard: Microwave Music (2007)
Don't I Look Good/I'm Spinnin' It (2007)
Hustle Hard: 500 Grams (2005)

References

External links

African-American male rappers
Def Jam Recordings artists
Southern hip hop musicians
Living people
Rappers from South Carolina
People from Ridgeway, South Carolina
21st-century American rappers
21st-century American male musicians
Year of birth missing (living people)
21st-century African-American musicians